The 1992 NAIA Men's Division I Basketball Tournament was held in March at Kemper Arena in Kansas City, Missouri. The 55th annual NAIA basketball tournament featured 32 teams playing in a single-elimination format.

Awards and honors
Leading scorers: 
Leading rebounder: 
Player of the Year: est. 1994.

1992 NAIA bracket

  * denotes overtime.

See also
1992 NAIA Division I women's basketball tournament
1992 NCAA Division I men's basketball tournament
1992 NCAA Division II men's basketball tournament
1992 NCAA Division III men's basketball tournament
1992 NAIA Division II men's basketball tournament

References

Tournament
NAIA Men's Basketball Championship
NAIA Division I men's basketball tournament
NAIA Division I men's basketball tournament